Elias Langham (1749 – April 1830), born in Essex County, Virginia, was an American politician, land surveyor and soldier. He was a member of the Ohio House of Representatives representing Ross County, Ohio from 1803 to 1806 and served as speaker of that house from December 5, 1803 to December 2, 1804.

References

External links

1749 births
1830 deaths
People from Essex County, Virginia
People from Ross County, Ohio
Virginia colonial people
American surveyors
Speakers of the Ohio House of Representatives
Continental Army officers from Virginia
Members of the Ohio House of Representatives